The Appoquinimink River is a river flowing to Delaware Bay in northern Delaware in the United States.

The Appoquinimink flows for its entire length in southern New Castle County. In its upper course the river passes through two man-made lakes, Wiggins Mill Pond and Noxontown Lake; the river is tidal to the dam at Noxontown Lake, and salinity from Delaware Bay typically affects the lowermost  of the river. The lower  of the river are considered to be navigable by the U.S. Army Corps of Engineers.

According to 2002 data from the United States Environmental Protection Agency, 54.9% of the Appoquinimink River watershed is occupied by agricultural uses (predominantly soybeans, corn, and wheat); 15.1% is residential; 9.9% is wetland; and 8.8% is forested.

In 2004, a non-profit group, The Appoquinimink River Association, was founded with a mission to protect the water and natural resources in the region surrounding the Appoquinimink River.

Variant names and spellings
The United States Board on Geographic Names issued a decision clarifying the stream's name in 1950.  According to the Geographic Names Information System, the Appoquinimink River has also been known historically as:

See also
 List of Delaware rivers
 List of Delaware River tributaries

References

External links
North Carolina State University: Appoquinimink River basin project
Appoquinimink River Association

Tributaries of Delaware Bay
Rivers of Delaware
Rivers of New Castle County, Delaware